BK Infiz (in Ukrainian: СК "ИНФИЗ") was a professional basketball team based in Kyiv, Ukraine.  In the 2015–16 season, the team entered the Ukrainian SL Favorit Sport – a newly formed top-tier league in Ukraine.

Notable players
 Andriy Lebedintsev
 Artem Shvets

Season by season

References

External links
Official website 

Defunct basketball teams in Ukraine
Sport in Kyiv
Basketball teams established in 2015
Basketball teams disestablished in 2016
2015 establishments in Ukraine
2016 disestablishments in Ukraine